is a passenger railway station located in the city of Tachikawa, Tokyo, Japan, operated by the private railway operator Seibu Railway, and a monorail station operated by the Tokyo Tama Intercity Monorail in Higashiyamato, Tokyo, Japan. The two stations are adjacent to, and at right angles to one another, with the border between the two cities passing in between the stations. The names of the stations are identical in Japanese, but are transliterated slightly different in romaji such that the Seibu Station is Tamagawa-Jōsui Station, whereas the Tokyo Tama Intercity Monorail is Tamagawajosui Station (i.e. without the hypen or diacritic mark).

Lines
Tamagawa-Jōsui Station is served by the Seibu Haijima Line, and is 7.2 kilometers from the terminus of that line at Kodaira Station. The monorail station is served by the Tama Toshi Monorail Line and is 1.5 kilometers from the terminus of the line at Kamikitadai Station.

Station layout

Seibu Railway
The Seibu station consists of two island platforms served by three tracks. In between the two island platforms, there is a single track.

Tama Toshi Monorail

The elevated station consists of two side platforms served by two tracks.

History
The Seibu station opened on May 15, 1950. The Tama Toshi Monorail station opened on 27 November 1998.

An enclosed waiting room was built on the Haijima Line platform in November 2007.

Station numbering was introduced on the Tama Toshi Monorail Line in February 2018 with its station being assigned TT17.

In celebration of the 10th service anniversary of the Seibu 30000 series "Smile Train" as well as Gudetama's 5th birthday (both in April 2018), one of its 30000 series trains, the station's signboards and waiting areas will adopt the "Gudetama" theme beginning March 2018.

Passenger statistics
In fiscal 2019, the station was the 22nd busiest on the Seibu network with an average of 42,416 passengers daily. During the same year, the Tama Monorail reported an average of 24,696 passengers daily.

The passenger figures for previous years are as shown below.

Surrounding area
The station area is a mix of residential apartment blocks and commercial buildings. Tamagawa-Jōsui, the source waterway of the Tama River, flows to the south of the station. The Risshō Kōsei Kai Kōsei cemetery is a short walk northwest.

The former Yamato Air Station (大和基地), used by the U.S forces after the end of the second world war, was on the land adjacent (northeast) of the station. A commemorative monument for the base is located a short distance from the (monorail) station's east exits.

See also
 Tamagawa Aqueduct
 List of railway stations in Japan

References

External links

  Tamagawa-Jōsui Station information (Seibu Railway) 
 Tamagawa-Jōsui Station information (Tama Monorail) 

Railway stations in Tokyo
Tama Toshi Monorail
Seibu Haijima Line
Railway stations in Japan opened in 1950
Higashiyamato, Tokyo
Tachikawa, Tokyo